Ringsend College is a multi-denominational secondary school and further education college run by the City of Dublin Education and Training Board (CDETB). The college operates under a local Sub Committee which is representative of parents, staff, community, local primary schools and industry. It is chaired by Cllr. Kevin Humphreys.

The college offers a range of courses including Junior Cert, Leaving Cert, Repeat Leaving Cert, Post leaving Cert (PLC in Computer Systems and Information Technology) and FIT/VTOS Adult programmes.

Location 

Ringsend College is on Cambridge Road, Ringsend.

It overlooks the Liffey, near the East Link Toll Bridge, the college is near bus routes nos. 3 and 18 and is also accessible by DART from Lansdowne Road and Barrow Street.

Junior Certificate 
There is a 3-year programme for the Junior Certificate covering core subjects English, Irish, Maths, Religious Education, Science and Physical Education.

Other subjects vary from year to year depending on demand and can include French, Woodwork M.T.W., Art, Metalwork, Home Economics, Technical Graphics, Business Studies, Music.

Leaving Certificate 

This is a 2-year programme covering 5th & 6th Years. The core subjects are: English, Irish, Maths, Religious Education, French and LCVP Link Module.

Optional subjects are Art, Engineering, Home Economics, Business Studies, Biology, History, Geography, Music.

At the senior cycle, there is a strong emphasis on career guidance. Preparation for work and specific job opportunities are dealt with by the Guidance Counsellor. Also, full information and advice is given regarding CAO/CAS applications and all other further educational opportunities.

Other courses 
Currently running Computer Systems and Information Technology courses (Post Leaving Certificate Courses).

Parttime courses include a "Back to Education Initiative" (BTEI).

External links
 Official Website

Education in Dublin (city)
Vocational education in the Republic of Ireland
Ringsend
Secondary schools in County Dublin